Eduardo Zazueta (born 18 May 1944) is a Mexican boxer. He competed in the men's light welterweight event at the 1964 Summer Olympics. At the 1964 Summer Olympics, he lost to John Olulu of Kenya.

A native of San Luis Río Colorado, he was the amateur national champion in 1962 and competed at the 1963 Pan American Games.

References

External links
 

1944 births
Living people
Mexican male boxers
Olympic boxers of Mexico
Boxers at the 1964 Summer Olympics
Light-welterweight boxers
Boxers from Sonora
Sportspeople from San Luis Río Colorado